British logistics in the Western Allied invasion of Germany was the support of Field Marshal Sir Bernard Montgomery's Anglo-Canadian 21st Army Group and the RAF Second Tactical Air Force operations in the Second World War from 8 January 1945 until the end of the war in Europe on 8 May 1945. To conserve scarce manpower, the British and Canadian forces employed mechanisation and materiel to maximum effect. This involved prodigious use of ammunition, fuel and equipment, which in turn demanded a first-class military logistics system. By 1945 the British Army was highly experienced, professional and proficient.

Originally scheduled to start at the beginning of January 1945, when the ground would have been frozen, Operation Veritable, the 21st Army Group's advance to the Rhine, was delayed for five weeks by the German Ardennes Offensive. It was therefore conducted over muddy and sometimes flooded ground, and roads were sometimes impassable even to four-wheel-drive vehicles. The offensive was supported by 600 field and 300 medium guns. Over 2.5 million rounds of 25-pounder ammunition were made available. The army roadheads were mainly supplied by rail. Special arrangements were made to supply the Royal Air Force's Fog Investigation and Dispersal Operation, which consumed  a night, and Gloster Meteor jet fighters, which consumed  of kerosene each  day. Montgomery's armies were reinforced by the redeployment of three divisions from Italy under Operation Goldflake.

The next major operation was Operation Plunder—the assault crossing of the Rhine on 23 March. For this the British Second Army deployed 1,520 field and medium guns, and the US Ninth Army had 624 field and medium guns. They were augmented by 1,891 and 1,446 anti-aircraft guns and anti-tank guns. A large force of engineer units was assembled for the operation: 37,000 British and Canadian engineers and pioneers, and 22,000 American engineers. Every available amphibious craft was collected, and they were joined by a Royal Navy contingent of 36 Landing Craft Medium (LCM) and 36 Landing Craft, Vehicle, Personnel (LCVP) that were transported by road across Holland and Belgium to participate. Operation Plunder included an airborne operation, Operation Varsity, in which two airborne divisions were landed with  a day's supply of food, fuel and petrol. Engineers soon had bridges over the Rhine in operation, which were then superseded by more permanent road and rail bridges.

Until the railway bridges could be brought into operation, maintenance depended entirely on road transport. The 21st Army Group allocated additional  road transport capacity to the armies by shifting vehicles from the rear areas and immobilising units that were not immediately needed. The corps sometimes had to send their transport back to the army roadheads to assist when major operations were required. The high use of road transport meant that the British Second Army burned  of petrol a day, but pipelines were laid across the Rhine at Emmerich and were in operation by the end of April. On 4 May Montgomery took the surrender of the German forces in front of the 21st Army Group.

Background 

Field Marshal Sir Bernard Montgomery's 21st Army Group consisted of the General Harry Crerar's First Canadian Army and Lieutenant General Sir Miles Dempsey's British Second Army. While most of its units were British or Canadian, there were also contingents from Belgium, the Netherlands, Czechoslovakia and Poland, and the RAF Second Tactical Air Force operating in support also had Australian, French, New Zealand and Norwegian squadrons. Although it contained personnel from many nations, the logistical support was British. The Canadian historian, Charles Stacey noted that:

The 21st Army Group's campaign in North West Europe had commenced with Operation Overlord, the Allied landings in Normandy on D-Day, 6 June 1944. German resistance was stubborn, and the British and Canadian advance much slower than planned until July, when the American Operation Cobra broke through the German defences. What followed was a far more rapid advance than anticipated. The British Second Army liberated Brussels on 3 September, and Antwerp was captured virtually intact on 4 September, but it could not be used as a port until the Germans were cleared from the Scheldt approaches, through which ships had to pass to reach the port. This required a major operation, and the Battle of the Scheldt was not concluded and the port opened for shipping until 26 November. Antwerp had sufficient capacity to support both the British and American forces, but its use was hampered by German V-weapon attacks.

A new base was developed around Brussels, and an advanced base area around Antwerp, but supplies were still being drawn from the Rear Maintenance Area (RMA) in Normandy. To get the railway system in operation again required the reconstruction of bridges and the importation of additional locomotives. Petrol was brought in tankers and over the Operation Pluto pipeline. Civilian labour was utilised at the bases in a variety of tasks to enable military personnel to be released for service in forward areas. By January 1945, some 90,000 civilians were employed by the 21st Army Group, of whom half were employed in workshops in the advanced base, and 14,000 at the port of Antwerp.

During the German Ardennes Offensive in December 1944, the Supreme Allied Commander, General of the Army Dwight D. Eisenhower, transferred the US First and Ninth Armies to Montgomery's command. With the German offensive defeated, the US First Army reverted to American command on 18 January 1945, but the US Ninth Army remained part of the 21st Army Group until 4 April. The US XVIII Airborne Corps was assigned to the 21st Army Group for the crossing of the Rhine, and again on 25 April for operations between the Elbe and the Baltic Sea.  

Eisenhower ordered Montgomery to resume his preparations for Operation Veritable, the objective of which was to defeat the German forces west of the Rhine. He intended to make the main Allied effort in the north, in the 21st Army Group's sector. There were tactical, operational and political reasons for this: the best sites for a crossing of the Rhine were there; a crossing in the north gave access to the North German Plain, where the terrain was good for mobile warfare, for which his Allied forces were particularly suited; it offered a means of cutting off the Ruhr, a major industrial region of Germany; and it had the political advantage of involving the British and Canadians. After some debate, the Combined Chiefs of Staff endorsed his strategy at the Malta Conference in January and February 1945.

Operation Goldflake 

The Combined Chiefs further decided to reinforce Eisenhower's armies in North West Europe at the expense of those in the Mediterranean. In view of pressure from the Canadian government to have its forces reunited, the Combined Chiefs decided to send the two divisions of the I Canadian Corps to rejoin the First Canadian Army, followed by up to three British divisions. This was codenamed Operation Goldflake, and it involved the redeployment of the I Canadian Corps and British 5th Division from Italy to North West Europe. At this time the ration strength of the 21st Army Group was around 1.2 million, while that of the Mediterranean theatre was 1.4 million. The transfer involved 102,415 troops. A request from the 21st army Group for additional resources to support the redeployed formations was rejected by the War Office; any additional support units required had to either be drawn from the Mediterranean or supplied by the 21st Army Group. To secure the required transportation resources, eleven general transport companies, seven artillery transport platoons, a tank transporter company, a bulk petrol transport company, a petrol depot, a bridge company and an ambulance car company were transferred from Italy.

Finding the additional service and supply units proved difficult, as the Mediterranean theatre had long been short of them. The 21st Army Group asked for four base supply depots (BSDs), six field bakeries, three field butcheries, a cold storage depot and two detail issue depots (DIDs). The Mediterranean theatre was only able to provide two field bakeries. The War Office found that it could provide another two field bakeries from the United Kingdom, along with three field butcheries that were already scheduled to be sent. The other units could not be found, and the 21st Army Group was informed that it would have to make do without them.

The headquarters of the 9th Line of Communications Area was transferred to Paris to assist the American Communications Zone with the move. Advance parties from each formation involved travelled by air from Florence, but most Operation Goldflake units moved by sea. It was arranged that 40 tanks, 650 wheeled vehicles, 50 Bren gun carriers, and 3,700 personnel would disembark each day in Marseilles, where accommodation was provided for 10,000 troops in tents and 200 vehicles. The first troops sailed from Naples on the troop ship SS Esperance Bay on 22 February, and arrived at Marseilles two days later. Lorries then took them to the dispersal point at Renaix via Lyon and Dijon, guided by road markers that read "GF". This took another five days. The first vehicles to arrive came with only fifty drivers, so a detachment from 141 Vehicle Park was sent to Marseilles from the RMA. In due course it was relieved by a vehicle park from Italy.

A rail halt was established at Gevrey-Chambertin and bivouac areas at Montbard and Chalon-sur-Saône. The bivouac areas were provided with temporary billets, latrines, emergency rations and fuel, and medical teams and vehicle maintenance crews were on hand. At the rail stop there were messes and a kitchen that ran 24 hours a day. During the two-hour rail halt, the troops were served a hot meal and provided with sandwiches for the next one. Four trains a day passed through Gevrey-Chambertin, which handled 72,550 personnel and 4,035 trucks. Road transport accounted for another 29,865 personnel and 23,360 trucks.

On 10 February, the 5th Canadian Armoured Division loaded its 450 tanks and 320 Bren gun carriers on flat wagons in Rimini and Riccione, from whence they moved by rail to Leghorn. They were then loaded into landing ships, tank (LSTs) that took them to Marseilles, and onto flat wagons again for the five-day railway journey to Dixmude. Initially Goldflake convoys sailed to Marseilles by a direct route but after the Battle of the Ligurian Sea on the night of 17/18 March they were routed further south, through the Strait of Bonifacio between Corsica and Sardinia. Many of the tanks needed overhaul or modification and this task was beyond the resources of the 21st Army Group's REME units, so excess tanks were shipped to the UK. The problem had been foreseen, and replacements were available at the ordnance depots. All movements were completed by the second week of April.

Development of the line of communications

Fuel 
At the start of January 1945, British bulk storage facilities were more than sufficient to hold the thirty days' reserve of petrol, oil and lubricants (POL) that Supreme Headquarters Allied Expeditionary Force (SHAEF) stipulated should be held, but the American position was not so good. It was therefore agreed that from 1 March onwards,  of fuel held in British storage would be transferred to the Americans so that both armies could have thirty days' reserves. The pipeline running from Cherbourg to Rouen was shut down on 9 January, which freed personnel to work on extending other pipelines. The Operation Pluto Dumbo pipeline was now in operation. It drew fuel from Dungeness on the coast of Kent and transported it across the Strait of Dover to a terminal near Boulogne. Pipelines were now constructed from Calais to Ghent, and thence to the storage facilities around Antwerp.

The bulk petrol transport companies that distributed the fuel were reorganised, with each company now having four instead of three platoons, so eight companies were reduced to six. This saved 150 vehicles, from which a seventh company was formed. Another three-platoon company arrived from Italy with the Operation Goldflake units. A petrol station company was formed from personnel made surplus by the reorganisation with six platoons, each containing three sections. Another petrol depot arrived from Italy in April. In addition to the road transport, the 21st Army Group also had barges capable of carrying  of bulk POL.

In February, a French fuel installation was opened at Douai, and this was used to supply the Royal Air Force (RAF) airfields in the vicinity. No. 616 Squadron RAF began operating Gloster Meteor jet fighters from Brussels, and they required kerosene. A German V-2 rocket scored a direct hit on the British POL installation at Antwerp on 19 January. A train caught alight, and the fire spread to three nearby storage tanks. Although only  of petrol was lost, POL storage tanks capable of holding  were rendered unusable. As a result of this fire it was decided to remove camouflage from the oil storage tanks, because it was not effective against the V-2, and hampered fire fighting efforts.

Organisation 
This included 15,000,000 rations, which were gradually eaten by the troops in the RMA. Stores still required by the 21st Army Group were moved forward to the new advanced base, and the rest returned to the War Office for disposal. The first phase of this was the transfer of remaining stores to the advanced base. This had been scheduled to occur on 20 March 1945, but in early February it was brought forward to 20 February. Depots and stocks remaining in the RMA were transferred to the control of the War Office.

On 15 February, the region south of the Seine under British administration by 5th Line of Communications Sub Area and the 101st Beach Sub Area were reduced to the ports of Caen and Ouistreham and the depots around them, while that administered by the 9th Line of Communications Sub Area was handed over to the US Communications Zone, as was the region between the Somme and the Seine administered by the 6th Line of Communications Sub Area, except for the city of Amiens. This freed the 9th Line of Communications Sub Area to participate in Operation Goldflake.

It was estimated that seven line of communications sub area headquarters would be required to support the advance into Germany. Only three could be provided by the 21st Army Group: the 5th Line of Communications Sub Area and the 101st Beach Sub Area when released from the RMA, and the 9th Line of Communications Sub Area, when it was no longer required for Operation Goldflake. The War Office therefore created a new headquarters, called the 25th Garrison, to take over the RMA, and four new line of communications sub area headquarters, the 17th, 18th, 19th and 20th.

The 25th Garrison assumed control of the RMA on 2 April, allowing the 5th Line of Communications Sub Area to take over the western part of North Brabant, and the 101st Beach Sub Area, which became the 21st Line of Communications Sub Area, took over the territory west of the Maas. The 17th and 19th Line of Communications Sub Area assumed responsibility for the region around Lille, allowing the 15th Line of Communications Sub Area to move to the area between the Maas and the Rhine. The 18th Line of Communications Sub Area was formed on 25 April and assigned to the First Canadian Army; the 19th joined the 15th; and the 20th relieved the 4th around Brussels, allowing it to take over the region to the north east of Nijmegen. The 6th Line of Communications Sub Area was earmarked to take over the administration of the port of Rotterdam when it was captured. The 11th Line of Communications Area took over the administration of the ports and the entire advanced base area, freeing the 12th Line of Communications Area headquarters to move forward.

Operation Veritable

Planning
Originally scheduled to start on 12 January 1945, when the ground would have been hard and frozen and off-road vehicle movement possible, Operation Veritable was delayed for five weeks by the Ardennes Offensive. By this time a thaw had set in, and the ground was now soft and muddy, restricting off-road vehicle movement. It would be carried out by the First Canadian Army, which was built up to a strength of 449,865 personnel through the addition of large numbers of British troops; counting civilians and prisoners of war, the army had a ration strength of 476,193. Operation Veritable would be spearheaded by the five British divisions of Lieutenant General Sir Brian Horrocks's XXX Corps, and would form part of a giant pincer movement with Operation Grenade, which would be conducted by Lieutenant General William H. Simpson's US Ninth Army. Operation Veritable was scheduled to commence on 8 February, but the date for Operation Grenade could not be set, as it depended on the capture of dams on the Roer further south by the US First Army. Operation Blackcock, a preliminary operation to clear German forces from the Roer Triangle, was carried out by the XII Corps in January 1945. The position gained along the Roer was then taken over by the US Ninth Army.

The artillery fire plan for Operation Veritable called for the widespread use of "pepperpot tactics". Operational research had shown that the number of guns saturating an area was more important than the actual weight of shells fired. Pepperpot tactics involved supplementing the artillery fire with that of anti-tank guns, anti-aircraft guns, mortars and machine guns. This involved a large expenditure of ammunition, including some that was in short supply like ML 4.2-inch mortar rounds and the Mark VIIIz ammunition used by the Vickers machine gun. Some 600 field and 300 medium guns would support the operation. Over 2.5 million rounds of 25-pounder ammunition was made available for Operation Veritable. The 25-pounders were each provided with an additional 1,471 rounds in addition to the 206 rounds per gun each regiment normally carried.

Stocks of ammunition were built up at No. 166 Field Maintenance Centre (FMC) at Veghel and the two Canadian FMCs at Wijchen and Oss. No. 166 FMC was developed from one formerly established there by the VIII Corps, although it had to be expanded as XXX Corps had over 200,000 troops under its command for Operation Veritable. To simplify storage and handling, only ammunition for field, medium and heavy artillery was held at the Canadian FMCs, ammunition for all other weapons was stocked at No. 166 FMC. There were 350 different types of ammunition in all. No. 166 FMC also held 200 rounds per gun of field, 175 rounds per gun of medium, 175 rounds per gun of heavy and 50 rounds per gun of super-heavy artillery ammunition. Medium and heavy ammunition for units north of the Maas was stockpiled at Wijchen and that for those south of the Maas at Oss. The former held 200 rounds per gun of medium and 250 rounds per gun of heavy artillery ammunition, while the latter held 200 rounds per gun of medium and 150 rounds per gun of heavy artillery ammunition. Both stocked 200 rounds per gun of field artillery ammunition for the entire XXX Corps.

The opening of a railway bridge over the Maas at Ravenstein on 4 February enabled the FMCs to be served by rail. This reduced the pressure on the road network, and also permitted stone for road works to be supplied by rail. Road maintenance was made especially difficult by the winter weather. Nearly 50 engineer companies, together with three road construction companies and 29 pioneer companies, were engaged in road maintenance. Four main road routes were available for troop movements, utilising road bridges over the Maas at Grave, Mook and Ravenstein. It was estimated that each could carry 7,000 vehicles per day under frozen conditions and 4,000 per day during a thaw. Operation Veritable required 35,000 vehicle movements, mainly to move XXX Corps units  in nineteen days. To coordinate troop movements between the First Canadian Army and the British Second Army, a joint office known as "Grouping Control" was established. For security reasons, troop movements had to be conducted at night. Despite the weather, all movements were completed as planned by 8 February.

Because it was not anticipated that the advance would be rapid, it was not considered necessary to hold large stocks of petrol, oil and lubricants (POL) in the FMCs, but to ensure that vehicles moving to the assembly areas arrived with full tanks of fuel, a train loaded with petrol was sent to Nijmegen to allow them to be topped off. Rations were moved forward however, and 2,318,222 rations were stockpiled for Operation Veritable. As it was thought that vehicle movement in the battle area would be restricted by the weather, terrain and battle damage, units were issued with "compo" ration packs for up to two-thirds of a formation's strength, and the divisions and independent brigades were also supplied with two-, three- and five-man "AFV" ration packs in case the distribution of compo packs proved to be too difficult. The troops in the assault units were issued with 24-hour ration packs, together with a Tommy cooker and a tin containing tea, condensed milk and sugar, enabling the troops in the front line to brew a hot cup of tea. Each of the assaulting infantry carried five days' supplies, and the armoured divisions carried six. This gave them sufficient petrol to advance for  respectively, although no such rapid advance was contemplated, the supplies being to sustain the divisions in operations when the road network became congested with operational traffic.

Special tracks were provided for the Bren gun carriers to prevent skidding on icy roads, but these had to be withdrawn when it was discovered that they caused excessive wear and tear on their suspensions. The tracks of Sherman tanks were equipped with "duck bill" connectors to facilitate advancing across snow and soft ground. These were manufactured locally in Brussels and fitted in Royal Electrical and Mechanical Engineers (REME) workshops. Extremely cold conditions persisted into February, and the divisions were issued with Arctic clothing and equipment that had been stockpiled for operations in Norway. A special effort was made to ensure that all units had their full allowance of winter and protective clothing. There was also demand for covered accommodation in the 3,300 bivouacs, and  21st Army Group headquarters released 343 huts and 1,600  tents from its stocks, which were delivered to the railheads around Mill and  's-Hertogenbosch. Covered accommodation was eventually provided for between 300,000 and 400,000 troops.

Thus far in the campaign in North West Europe, XXX Corps had only served as part of the British Second Army, and it found that maintenance procedures of the First Canadian Army differed from what it had been used to due to the fact that the First Canadian Army's operations had been conducted where there had been adequate communications. Consequently, the daily pack trains that carried supplies were normally run straight through from the advanced base to the corps railheads, which were normally stocked on a commodity basis, and the roadheads supporting the First Canadian Army carried much less stock than its British Second Army counterparts. This saved on road transport, but at the cost of some degree of flexibility. It did not remove the need from road transport entirely though, and XXX Corps found that the First Canadian Army was unable to provide any additional resources. Fourteen transport platoons, each of which operated thirty vehicles, were taken from the formations to serve the corps's needs. The possibility that the Germans might flood the forward area was not overlooked, and a company of DUKW amphibious trucks and a platoon of Terrapin amphibious vehicles was on 48-hours notice to assist. During February  of supplies were delivered to the XXX Corps railheads. Supplies and POL were stocked at Eindhoven; POL at Schijndel; ammunition at Veghel, Uden, Oss and Wijchen; road material at Mill; coal at Best; and bridging at 's-Hertogenbosch.

Execution

Once the battle commenced on 8 February, the main administrative task was replenishing the stocks of ammunition. Since the First Canadian Army did not hold large stocks at No. 11 Army Roadhead, it was dependent on the daily arrival of ammunition trains. Daily expenditure of ammunition soon exceeded a trainload, so the non-arrival of even one train meant that ammunition had to be drawn from the Second Army roadhead at Bourg Leopold. Since prompt clearance of the trains was essential to allow turnaround of the locomotives and rolling stock, vehicles had to be used to clear less urgently required supplies such as POL, coal and engineer stores. Ammunition expenditure was prodigious, and a system of rationing had to be introduced. This was never satisfactorily implemented, and confusion and duplication was created by the same requests for additional ammunition being made through multiple channels.

Rising flood waters soon created difficulties. By 9 February sections of the Nijmegen-Kranenburg road were under  of water. The  of the Nijmegen-Cleve road was under  of water, and DUKWs were employed to move supplies forward along it to a "skeleton" FMC, No. 167 FMC, established by the XXX Corps which held only petrol, compo ration packs and ammunition. To maximise their turnaround time, they were only used to cover the flooded stretch, with loads transferred to them and unloaded from them into other vehicles at each end. Some of the ammunition that had earlier been dumped was to be made inaccessible by flood waters. It was also feared for a time that the skeleton FMC was in danger of being inundated, although it was sited on high ground. Preparations were made to move it to a new site, but this was not required. The 3rd Canadian Division made use of Buffalo tracked amphibious vehicles. In the forward area, land mines and the few tracks through the Reichswald Forest kept transport on the roads, and the traffic combined with thaws and heavy rains contributed to the rapid deterioration of the roads. Recourse was therefore made to Weasel tracked vehicles, and every available Weasel was rushed to the front. Many had seen hard use in the Ardennes, where they had demonstrated their utility, and large numbers were in the REME workshops. An emergency repair effort was conducted, and many were shipped direct from the workshops to the front lines.

When the II Canadian Corps assumed control of the left sector on 15 February, No. 167 FMC was handed over to it, and became No. 206 FMC. XXX Corps opened a new No. 168 FMC near Goch. The XXX Corps FMC series started at 151 while the II Canadian Corps one started at 201, and the stark difference in maintenance practices between the two corps was illustrated by the fact that XXX Corps had opened three times as many FMCs in the campaign up to this point. When the flood waters subsided, it was found that the Nijmegen-Cleve road surface had been too badly damaged to use, so the II Canadian Corps and XXX Corps were forced to share the road running south of the Reichswald. XXX Corps reverted to the control of the British Second Army on 8 March, and by 10 March the last German units had retreated across the Rhine. The two corps stocked their FMCs by road, but the completion of repairs to the  bridge over the Maas at Gennep by the 7th Army Troops Engineers on 20 March relieved the pressure on the one at Grave, and it became possible to move the railhead to within the No. 168 FMC area at Goch.

Operation Plunder

Planning

With Antwerp in operation, some supplies were now coming directly from the United States. The longer shipping time meant that a working margin of 30 days' supplies was desirable instead of the one of 14 days for shipments from the United Kingdom. It was also anticipated that as the Allied advance proceeded into Germany, there would be increased demand to feed and accommodate prisoners of war, liberated Allied prisoners and displaced persons. It would also free transport to support a rapid advance. A request for an increase in the theatre reserves from 28 to 51 days was approved by the War Office, but it was not possible to increase the stockpile of ammunition, as this was already being shipped at the maximum rate. On the other hand, the 21st Army Group held sufficient stocks of POL to accede to a request from SHAEF to allocate  of petrol for US use.

The next major operation was Operation Plunder—the assault crossing of the Rhine. For this the British Second Army deployed 1,520 field and medium guns, and the US Ninth Army had 624 field and medium guns. They were respectively augmented by 1,891 and 1,446 anti-aircraft guns and anti-tank guns. Ammunition for the 25-pounders was based on 1,500 rounds per gun. In the three days preceding the assault, the three hundred and thirty six 25-pounders assigned to the XII Corps fired 225,061 rounds, the sixteen 4.5-inch guns fired 7,002 rounds, the one hundred and sixty 5.5-inch guns fired 69,607 rounds, the fifty two 155 mm howitzers fired 4,335 rounds, the sixteen 7.2-inch howitzer fired 3,964 rounds, and the two 8-inch howitzers 176 rounds. In addition, XII Corps employed 48 3.7-inch anti-aircraft guns in the ground role, and they fired 16,573 rounds. Up to seven trains per day were required to move the ammunition from the advance base to the ammunition railheads at No. 10 Army Roadhead. A smoke screen concealed preparations on the west bank of the Rhine. Demands for smoke generators exhausted the available stocks and generators were taken from the anti-aircraft gun positions around Antwerp.

A large force of engineer units was assembled for the operation: 37,000 British and Canadian engineers and pioneers, and 22,000 American engineers. Every available amphibious craft was collected. In addition to the storm boats, DUKWs, Buffaloes and Weasels, there were also amphibious DD tanks. The Royal Navy formed Force U, consisting of three squadrons, each with a flotilla of twelve Landing Craft Medium (LCM), and a flotilla of twelve Landing Craft, Vehicle, Personnel (LCVP), which were transported by road across Holland and Belgium to participate. The base workshops built a prototype trailer that provided more clearance, and the Navy ordered 25 of them. Five days before the operation began, the Navy asked for 40 more, which were provided. The Kangaroo armoured personnel carriers and the Buffalo tracked amphibious vehicles of the 79th Armoured Division were overhauled between January and March.

The buildup of stocks for Operation Plunder commenced on 8 March. During the month, 432 trains delivered  to 37 railheads in the British Second Army area. The British rail line of communications now ran from Antwerp to Nijmegen  via Roosendaal and Tilburg, where the railway bridge that had opened on 22 December was duplicated by 3 January 1945. Second Army's VIII, XII and XXX Corps drew their supplies from No. 10 Army Roadhead, while the attached II Canadian Corps continued to draw its from the First Canadian Army's No. 13 Army Roadhead at Nijmegen. Units participating in Operation Plunder were re-equipped before the start of the operation. A special train brought the required stores to the Second Army railhead within 48 hours of a demand being lodged with the advance base. A problem was encountered when defects were discovered in the tensioners of the 29th Armoured Brigade's  new Comet tanks. A new type was flown out direct from the UK factory by priority air freight and fitted to the tanks. The British 6th Airborne Division was withdrawn to the UK and re-equipped there, but its seaborne tail had to be re-equipped by the 21st Army Group. This was a problem as its special equipment was not stocked. A new ordnance field park was formed to hold the equipment, which was shipped from the UK.

Execution

The two airborne divisions participating in Operation Varsity, the airborne operation supporting Operation Plunder,  were initially supplied by the First Allied Airborne Army. Their initial drop of the 6th Airborne Division was conducted by 683 aircraft and 444 General Aircraft Hamilcar and Airspeed Horsa gliders, while that of the US 17th Airborne Division used 913 aircraft and 906 Hadrian gliders. Fifteen minutes after the glider landings, there was a resupply mission flown by 240 Consolidated B-24 Liberator bombers from the US Eighth Air Force. Sixteen of the bombers were lost to anti-aircraft fire. The supplies dropped represented a day's supply of food, fuel and petrol for the two divisions.

Once the link-up with the ground forces was effected, the 6th Airborne Division drew its supplies from XII Corps, while the US 17th Airborne Division  drew its from the US Ninth Army. The seaborne tail of the 6th Airborne Division established a DUKW replenishment area west of the Rhine from whence supplies were moved until it could cross the river. XII Corps allocated sixty DUKWs each to the 6th Airborne Division, US 17th Airborne Division and the 15th Infantry Division; thirty were in corps reserve, nine were designated for casualty evacuation and six for the Royal Engineers. In XXX Corps, all DUKWs were retained under corps control.

The South Beveland Canal was opened on 19 February to allow inland water transport to reach the Dutch canal system when the western Netherlands were liberated. The Meuse-Escaut Canal was also opened that month, and by the end of March the Zuid-Willemsvaart and the Maas–Waal Canal were open as well, allowing barge traffic from Antwerp to reach the Waal. The road network was also developed, and by 23 March eleven routes were open across the Maas, of which six were in the First Canadian Army area, including the sole class 70 route (ie one capable of carrying loads of up to ) and five in the British Second Army area. The British Second Army also had access to the American class 70 timber pile bridge at Venlo and the Canadian First Army class 70 bridge at Grave. Only the class 70 bridges would take a loaded tank transporter.

At Gennep, the 6th Army Troops Engineers built a  class 30 Bailey bridge using the piers and abutments of a demolished railway bridge. A  class 40 Bailey pontoon bridge was erected by the 7th Army Troops Engineers at Well and a  one by the 6th Army Troops Engineers at Lottum was opened for traffic on 10 March. A  class 40 Bailey pontoon bridge was built at Venlo by the 15th GHQ Troops Engineers. These bridges carried maintenance traffic by day and operational traffic by night. Seven American combat engineer battalions assisted with road and bridge maintenance in the British Second Army area. Although working in the British Second Army area, they remained under the command of the US Ninth Army. The 21st Army Group headquarters also allocated three additional general transport companies to the British Second Army. The final troop movements for Operation Plunder involved 662 tanks, over 4,000 tank transporters and 32,000 other vehicles.

Vehicles crossing the Rhine did so with full fuel tanks and a reserve of filled jerricans. Additional supplies of fuel were loaded on DUKWs, which ferried fuel across the river until bridges were opened. Each man crossing the Rhine was issued with a 24-hour ration, an emergency ration, a tin of preserved meat, a tin of self-heating soup or cocoa, a packet of biscuits and a tommy cooker with six hexamine tablets. Divisions carried two days' compo rations in their first line (unit) transport and two days' in their second line (divisional) transport. The armoured divisions also carried a day's worth of AFV ration packs. The airborne troops landed with two 24-hour ration packs, and the 6th Airborne Division's seaborne tail held two days of compo rations in second line transport. A double issue of Expeditionary Force Institutes stores was made to all participating units. This included the 6th Airborne Division, but it was held by the seaborne tail.

The assault divisions established ordnance dumps on the west bank of the Rhine with at least one section of the divisional ordnance field park from which urgently required equipment and spare parts for vehicles could be sent across by DUKW without delay. Damaged vehicles on the east bank of the Rhine were collected at points near the river and transported back on rafts. XII and XXX Corps each formed a bank control group along the lines of the beach groups that had supported the Normandy landings in 1944, but with the logistical elements restricted to the medical, provost and REME components. The bank control groups controlled all movement from the marshalling areas on the near side of the Rhine to the dispersal areas on the far side. They only operated until newly constructed bridges were able to take traffic, which occurred about 72 hours into the operation.

The engineer units in the XII Corps assault area were under 11th Army Group, Royal Engineers (AGRE), commanded by Colonel R. B. Foster.  The XII Corps plan called for the construction of a class 9 Folding Boat Equipment (FBE) bridge, a class 12 Bailey pontoon bridge and two class 40 Bailey pontoon bridges. The first British bridge across the river was the class 9 FBE bridge, known as "Twist",  in the XII Corps area, which was erected by the VIII Corps Troops Engineers in ten hours on 24 March. A traffic jam broke the bridge during the night, but it was reopened thirteen hours later. The class 12 Bailey bridge, known as "Sussex", took the XII Corps Troops Engineers and the Royal Navy 43 hours to erect. Meanwhile, the class 40 Bailey pontoon bridge at Xanten was erected by the 7th Army Troops Engineers in 31 hours, and opened to traffic at 16:30 on 25 March. Over the next six days it was used by 29,139 vehicles. The second class 40 Bailey pontoon bridge, "Sparrow", was built by the 4th GHQ Troops Engineers on 27 March.

In the XXX Corps area, the engineer units were grouped under the 13th AGRE, under the command of Colonel F. C. Nottingham. The XXX Corps plan called for the construction of a class 9 FBE bridge, a class 15 Bailey pontoon bridge and two class 40 Bailey pontoon bridges. The "Waterloo" class 9 FBE could not be built at the intended site at Rees on 24 March because the town had not been captured. Instead, 18th GHQ Troops Engineers erected it the following day at a downstream site near the town of Honnopel. Work commenced at 09:30, and the bridge was opened for traffic at midnight. The XXX Corps Troops Engineers commenced work on the "Lambeth" class 15 Bailey pontoon bridge at 15:00 on 24 March, but work was frequently interrupted by German fire, and the bridge was not opened until 08:30 on 26 March. Due to the proximity of Rees, the VIII Corps Troops Engineers could not work on the "London" class 40 Bailey pontoon bridge until the afternoon of 25 March, and it was opened at 23:00 on 26 March. The second class 40 Bailey pontoon bridge, known as "Blackfriars", was built by the II Canadian Corps Engineers in 50 hours, starting at 10:00 on 26 March. A third bridge, "Westminster", was commenced by the 6th Army Troops Engineers on 26 March, completed at 18:00 on 29 March, and ceremoniously opened by Dempsey the next morning.

It was recognised in the planning of Operation Plunder that the maintenance of the floating bridges over the Rhine would require more engineers than could be spared from the campaign ahead. It was therefore decided that the floating bridges should be replaced by semi-permanent ones as soon as operational circumstances permitted. It was estimated that six one-way class 40 and two one-way class 70 pile bridges would be needed. To provide them, beech trees were felled in the Forêt de Soignes near Brussels. Some  of wooden piles, baulks and chesses was assembled for the project. These included  baulks and chesses that had originally been set aside for the construction of emergency bridges over the Thames. Twenty-five special vehicles were built in Army workshops to carry them. Due to changing operational requirements, it was ultimately decided to build only three semi-permanent class 40 bridges, at Xanten, Rees and Arnhem, and two class 70 bridges, at Rees and Arnhem. A semi-permanent class 40 bridge and a semi-permanent class 70 bridge were also built over the Ijssel at Zutphen. The class 40 timber pile bridge at Zanten, known as "Dempsey" was built by the 18th GHQ Troops Engineers and was opened on 26 May. The  class 40 and 70 steel-piled jetty bridges were built at Arnhem by the First Canadian Army engineers, and opened on 31 May, and the  class 40 and class 70 timber pile bridges at Zutphen were completed on 26 May.

Beyond the Rhine
During this advance it suffered 7,665 casualties and captured 78,108 prisoners. Until the railway bridges could be brought into operation, maintenance depended entirely on road transport. The 21st Army Group allocated an additional  of road transport capacity to the Second Army between 27 March and 3 April. Another  was reallocated from the First Canadian Army, and  platoons were made available, taking the transport from an anti-aircraft brigade. Another  was obtained from within the Second Army by grounding artillery and armoured units that were not immediately required for the advance.

Stocking of No. 12 Army Roadhead in the Rheine area commenced on 3 April, and the corps started drawing from it on 9 April. Between 6 and 8 April, the  21st Army Group released another  of road transport, along with two DUKW companies that were re-equipped with 3-ton trucks. This came from the reorganisation of the line of communications, and additional general transport companies arriving from Italy through Operation Goldflake. Stocking of No. 14 Army Roadhead in the Sulingen area from No. 10 Army Roadhead commenced on 13 April, and the first train arrived at No. 12 Army Roadhead via the American rail bridge at Wesel three days later. Three trains a day were run over this route under an arrangement with SHAEF and the American Military Railway Service. That day trains also began arriving at No. 16 Army Roadhead from locations around Bocholt using captured rolling stock and locomotives. German railway personnel were used to man two trains a day from Celle to Bienenbuttel. They were also utilised for duties such as manning level crossings. The expansion of the rail network allowed the 21st Army Group to give the Second Army another  of road transport capacity. Railway units were moved forward, and only one railway group headquarters and two railway operating companies were left in France, Belgium and the Netherlands south of the Waal.

Despite this, stocks at the Nos. 12 and 14 Army Roadheads were being run down. On 16 April XXX Corps sent its road transport back to the Rhine roadhead to collect the ammunition it needed to capture Bremen. Three days later, XII Corps did the same to facilitate the capture of Hamburg, but the expenditure of ammunition at Bremen was not as great as anticipated, and this allowed XII Corps's requirements to be met in full. VIII Corps also used its own transport to haul ammunition for the crossing of the Elbe on 28 April. A  Class 9 FBE bridge was built over the Elbe at Lauenburg by the VIII Corps engineers on 29 April. While it was under construction, the engineers came under attack by the Luftwaffe, and 8 men were killed and 22 wounded. This merely delayed work on the bridge, which was opened to traffic at 20:15. The following day  a German swimmer was seen affixing a suspicious cylindrical object to the bridge. The object sank after being cut loose during an attempt to recover it, and the swimmer was captured. At Artlenburg, 7th Army Troops engineers constructing a  class 40 Bailey pontoon bridge also came under air attack, and two of its mobile cranes were damaged by artillery fire, but the bridge was opened on schedule at 12:00 on 30 April. Over the next 24 hours, 7,415 vehicles crossed the bridge.

On 3 May an VIII Corps FMC at Lüneburg was taken over by the Second Army and used as an advance roadhead in conjunction with No. 14 Army Roadhead. The high use of road transport meant that the Second Army was burning  of petrol a day, but the supply of fuel caused no problems. The Dumbo pipeline was extended from Boulogne to Antwerp in March. Two pipelines were laid across the Rhine at Emmerich and were in operation by the end of April. It was decanted at Bocholt and transported by rail to No. 14 Army Roadhead. By mid-May the 21st Army Group's reserves had been reduced by a quarter.

New lines continued to be laid, the last one being laid to Bocholt on 24 May. British and Commonwealth PWX were flown directly to the UK, while American PWX were flown to collecting camps around Le Havre.

Meanwhile, the First Canadian Army established two lines of communications. No 13 Army Roadhead was opened at Nijmegen on 2 March, and was stocked by rail. No. 15 Army Roadhead opened in the Almelo area on 18 April and was stocked by road from No. 13 Army Roadhead. I Canadian Corps advanced on Utrecht, supported by No. 13 Army Roadhead while II Canadian Corps advanced on Oldenburg supported from No. 15 Army Roadhead. Emmerich was taken on 1 April after a three-day battle, to provide an additional bridgehead. Three bridges were constructed there, but by the time they opened II Canadian Corps already had its three Canadian divisions across the Rhine.

As the German forces crumbled before the Allied onslaught, the numbers of German prisoners of war grew to the point where orders were issued on 1 May that no more prisoners should be sent west of the Rhine. Four days later orders came that disarmed troops would no longer have prisoner of war status, but would be classified as Surrendered Enemy Personnel, and that their own officers would be responsible for their administration. Large numbers of displaced persons were also encountered, and they were accommodated in special camps. These provided health care and bathing and delousing with DDT to prevent the spread of disease. Their feeding was the responsibility of the German civilian population, but the British Army had to release a large number of NAAFI packs to displaced persons. By May the ration strength of the 21st Army Group had risen to 1.711 million.

On 4 May 1945, Montgomery accepted the German surrender at Lüneburg Heath, which covered German forces in the Netherlands, Dunkirk, North West Germany and Denmark. Four days later the German Instrument of Surrender was signed in Berlin, and the war with Germany was over.

Outcome
In the campaign in North West Europe in 1945, Montgomery sought to contribute to the defeat of Germany and to do so in a manner that displayed a visibly committed and active British role. He had to do so without incurring excessive casualties in order to ensure a prominent British role in the postwar political organisation of Europe and secure a stable and lasting peace. This was not easy to do when the 21st Army Group was fighting alongside the much larger American armies and had to deal with a severe manpower shortage. To compensate for this, to minimise casualties, and to maximise the combat effectiveness of what manpower they had, the British forces relied on machines, materiel and firepower.

The vast resources brought to bear was in stark contrast with scarcities of the early war years. Lend Lease aid from the United States and a high degree of industrial mobilisation provided the equipment and materiel. The British Army of 1944–1945 was highly mechanised, which conferred great tactical and strategic manoeuvrability, but at the same time demanded a high degree of organisation and professionalism to utilise the machines, materiel and firepower to best effect. In this campaign the British Army demonstrated its proficiency in logistics. The 21st Army Group's logistical system proved capable of keeping the fighting men fed and supplied, whether in the awful weather conditions of Operation Veritable, or the fast-moving advance of the final drive beyond the Rhine.

Notes

References

 
 
 
 
 
 
 
 
 
 
 
 
 
 
 
 
 
 
 
 
 
 
 
 
 
 

Military logistics of the United Kingdom
Military logistics of World War II
Western European Campaign (1944–1945)